Peer Gynt is a surviving 1915 American fantasy silent film directed by Oscar Apfel and Raoul Walsh and adapted from the Henrik Ibsen play by Oscar Apfel. The film stars Cyril Maude, Myrtle Stedman, Fanny Stockbridge, Mary Reubens, Mary Ruby and Winifred Bryson. The film was released on September 16, 1915, by Paramount Pictures.

Plot

Cast

Preservation status
Prints are preserved at the Library of Congress and the BFI National Film and Television Archive.

References

External links 
 

1915 films
American fantasy drama films
1910s fantasy drama films
Paramount Pictures films
Films directed by Oscar Apfel
Films directed by Raoul Walsh
Films based on works by Henrik Ibsen
American black-and-white films
Works based on Peer Gynt
American silent feature films
Surviving American silent films
1915 drama films
1910s English-language films
1910s American films
Silent American drama films